Redheap is a 1930 novel by Norman Lindsay. It is a story of life in a country town in Victoria, Australia in the 1890s. Lindsay portrays real characters struggling with the social restrictions of the day. Snobbery and wowserism are dominant themes.  In 1930 it became the first Australian novel to be banned in Australia.

The novel was adapted for television in 1972.

Plot
The central character is Robert Piper, a nineteen-year-old man engaging in love affairs with the publican's daughter and the parson's daughter next door. In an attempt to prevent him falling into immorality and dragging the family along with him, Piper's mother arranges for him to be tutored by Mr Bandparts, a recovering alcoholic school teacher. The arrangement soon backfires and Mr Bandparts is soon drinking beer with his young pupil and chasing the corpulent barmaid at the Royal Hotel.

The reader is introduced to the rest of the Piper family: Mr Piper, a draper who continuously measures objects to calm his mind; his eldest son Henry who has high hopes of taking over the business one day; the awful oldest daughter Hetty and her domineering ways in the drawing room, and her attempts to control the family morals and standing; Ethel the quiet younger daughter who uses her shyness to cover her various seductions of young men around town; and Grandpa Piper, who made the family fortunes only to be treated with contempt by the rest of the family in his dotage (his small acts of revenge make some of the most comic moments of the book).

Banning
The book was banned in Australia for 28 years after it was first published in 1930.

Proposed film
The novel was optioned for the movies in the 1930s for £1,000 but no movie was made.

Television adaptation

The novel was adapted into a three-part mini series by the ABC in 1972. It screened as part of Norman Lindsay Theatre on the ABC, where works for Lindsay were screened over nine weeks. Three of the weeks were devoted to Redheap.

Cast
Kate Fitzpatrick as Hetty
Peter Flett as Robert Piper
Michael Boddy
Pamela Stephenson
Norman Yemm
June Salter
Alexander Archdale
John Morris
John Wood

References

External links

Redheap TV adaptation at AustLit
Complete copy of script at National Archives of Australia

1930 Australian novels
Censored books
Australian Broadcasting Corporation original programming
1970s Australian television miniseries
1972 Australian television series debuts
1972 Australian television series endings
Television shows based on Australian novels
Faber and Faber books
Novels by Norman Lindsay